
Gmina Ochotnica Dolna is a rural gmina (administrative district) in Nowy Targ County, Lesser Poland Voivodeship, in southern Poland.

Villages
Gmina Ochotnica Dolna contains the villages and settlements of Młynne, Ochotnica Dolna, Ochotnica Górna and Tylmanowa.

Neighbouring gminas
Gmina Ochotnica Dolna is bordered by the gminas of Czorsztyn, Kamienica, Krościenko nad Dunajcem, Łącko and Nowy Targ.

References
 Polish official population figures 2006

Ochotnica Dolna
Nowy Targ County